Zardoui (also Romanized as Zardū’ī; also known as Ravān, Ravān-e Zardowī, Ravān-e Zardū’ī, Ravān Zardū’ī, Ravān Zardū’ī, and Rawān Zarūdeh) is a village in Makvan Rural District, Bayangan District, Paveh County, Kermanshah Province, Iran. At the 2006 census, its population was 1,078, in 258 families.
A Paleolithic site is recorded in the vicinity of the village where Paleolithic hunters used it for seasonal or short-term habitation during a period that archaeologists call Middle Paleolithic (40,000-200,000 years ago).(Arkeonews)

References 

Populated places in Paveh County